Dillivala Rajakumaran ( Delhiite Prince ) is a 1996 Malayalam film by Rajasenan starring Jayaram and Manju Warrier. The movie tells a fictional story inspired from Travancore Royal Family's famous Padiyettam ceremony (Royal adoption) which last happened in the year 1994 when Aswathi Thirunal Gowri Lakshmi Bayi of the Travancore Royal Family adopted Bharani Thirunal Lekha Parvathi Bayi.

Plot
Appu and Maya are childhood sweethearts and their parents have agreed to their marriage. Maya's father belongs to a branch of local royal family. Appu is treated by Maya's father as his own son and this makes her uncle jealous of him. However, Maya's life turns upside down when she is identified as the heir to her father's main royal family after her horoscope matches with the qualities that the royal family was looking for. The Maharaja proposes to adopt her as heir princess to continue the lineage. Greed and status makes her father look for ways to get rid of Appu who might stand as an obstacle and her Uncle then makes her hate Appu in order for her to marry someone from the royal family. Meanwhile, Appu, with his best friend Mani, tries to win her back by disguising himself as Veerandra Varma, nephew of the King whom none of them have seen before, being the son of King's estranged sister Rani Padmini. In the meantime, the real Veerandra Varma arrives at the palace, on a mission to steal the royal crown. Veerendra Varma is a spoiled brat and a famous rogue in Delhi, earning him the title as Dilliwala Rajakumaran.

Appu is trying to convince Maya about his innocence, who is in preparation of adoption as a princess. However it is prevented in many ways. Her uncle soon successfully unveils the real Veerandran's plot to steal the crown along with Appu (who was trying to avoid so) and both are imprisoned in a room until the royal ceremonies get over.

However the family priest, under instigation of the King's sister Padmini, helps both to escape and stops the Padiyettam ceremonies half way. In front of everyone, Appu discloses his innocence and love towards Maya. The King who is convinced of Appu's love, offers him a choice: whether he wishes to marry ordinary Maya or Princess Maya with no restrictions. The story ends with Maya completing the Padiyettam ceremony and sitting on the throne while Appu crowns her as his Princess.

Cast

Soundtrack 
The film's soundtrack contains 6 songs, all composed by Ouseppachan and Lyrics by S. Ramesan Nair.

References

External links
 
 About

1990s Malayalam-language films
Films scored by Ouseppachan
1996 romantic comedy films
1996 films
Films directed by Rajasenan
Indian romantic comedy films